Charles James Furey (July 20, 1874 – March 10, 1973) was a businessman and political figure in Newfoundland. He represented Harbour Main-Bell Island in the Newfoundland and Labrador House of Assembly from 1932 to 1934 as a member of the United Newfoundland Party.

He was born in Harbour Main, the son of Charles J. Furey, and was educated in Harbour Main and Avondale. Furey trained as a telegraph operator and then travelled and worked in various places in the United States and Canada. In 1902, he returned to Newfoundland and became a train station operator in Port Blandford. 

In 1912, he returned to Harbour Main, where he became a fish dealer. Furey ran unsuccessfully for a seat in the Newfoundland assembly in 1928 before being elected in 1932. After 1934, he served as a relief officer with the Department of Health and helped set up the Harbour Main school board. Furey died in Harbour Main at the age of 99.

References 

Businesspeople from the Dominion of Newfoundland
Knights Bachelor
1874 births
1973 deaths